Official diplomatic relations between Afghanistan and Australia were established in 1969. Between 1975 and 1987, the Afghan Ambassador to Japan was also accredited to Australia. After the creation of the Islamic Republic of Afghanistan after liberation from Taliban rule, Afghanistan has maintained a Resident Embassy in Canberra since 2002. The Ambassador to Australia is also concurrently Ambassador to both New Zealand and Fiji.

Afghan Non-Resident Ambassadors to Australia

Afghan Resident Ambassadors and Heads of Mission to Australia

See also 

 List of Afghan Ambassadors to New Zealand
 List of Afghan Ambassadors to Fiji
 Embassy of Afghanistan, Canberra

References

Afghanistan
Australia